Club Oriental de Football, sometimes referred to as Club Oriental de Fútbol, Club Oriental de La Paz, or simply Oriental, are a football club from La Paz, Uruguay. They currently play in the Uruguayan Segunda División Profesional, the second tier of the Uruguayan football league system.

History
Founded in 1924, the club played in regional leagues in the early years of its existence, joining the Uruguayan Football Association in the 1970s. The club were champions of the Uruguayan Segunda División Amateur in 2004 and 2007, but at the time the champions were not automatically promoted. After the club won the title again in 2008-09, the Uruguayan Football Association granted promotion to the Uruguayan Segunda División Profesional; however, the club were unable to meet the financial requirements of the higher tier, ultimately not playing at all in the 2009-10 season. They re-entered the Segunda División Amateur for 2010-11. After winning that league again in 2014-15, they were able to successfully gain promotion to the Segunda División Profesional.

Titles
Segunda División Amateur Uruguay: 4
2004, 2007, 2008-09, 2014-15

Football clubs in Uruguay
Association football clubs established in 1924
Football clubs in Montevideo
1924 establishments in Uruguay
La Paz, Canelones
Sport in Canelones Department